Captain Voyeur (1969) was the first short film by director John Carpenter while a student at USC Cinema. The 8-minute film is about a bored computer worker who becomes fixated on a woman at work and follows her back to her home. The film remained in the USC's Hugh M. Hefner Moving Image Archive until 2011, when it was rediscovered by archivist Dino Everett. The film is notable because it includes several elements that would appear in Carpenter's later horror film, Halloween. Everett says that the similarities include a striking resemblance between the lead actresses.

The film was selected in 2011 for preservation by the National Film Preservation Foundation because of its historical significance in showing  Carpenter's development as a filmmaker.

References

External links
 

Films directed by John Carpenter
1969 films
American student films
1969 short films
Films produced by John Carpenter
American short films
1960s English-language films